The Port Stanley Sailors are a Canadian Junior ice hockey team based in Port Stanley, Ontario. They play in the Provincial Junior Hockey League.

History
The Sailors were formerly known as the Belmont Bombers, playing their last season as the Bombers in 05-06. Prior to the 06-07 season, they changed their name to the Central Elgin Express.  This was done as the team was going to be splitting their home games between Belmont and Port Stanley. During the 07-08 season, the Express played all their home games in Port Stanley, which was formerly home to the Port Stanley Lakers, which became the West Lorne Lakers before leaving the OHA.

During the summer of 2008, it was announced that The Central Elgin Express had been sold by Peter North and Bill Walters to a group of four equal owners led by St. Thomas resident Dale J. Howard. The other three owners are Harold Lang, Matt Stolk and Mike Carson.  The Sailors were not able to play in 08-09 because the OHA schedule had already been finalized.  So the Sailors began play in 09-10.

The Express were affiliated with the St Thomas Stars of the Jr B Greater Ontario Hockey League from the 07-08 to the 09-10 seasons.

The majority of playoffs for the 2019'20 season were cancelled due to the COVID-19 pandemic. The Sailors were swept in the first round.

Season-by-season standings

Notable alumni
Rumun Ndur
Joe Thornton

Brandon Garner

References

External links
Port Stanley Sailors webpage

Southern Ontario Junior Hockey League teams